Aalborg Municipality is a municipality in North Jutland Region on the Jutland peninsula in northern Denmark. The municipality straddles the Limfjord, the waterway which connects the North Sea and the Kattegat east-to-west, and which separates the main body of the Jutland peninsula from the island of Vendsyssel-Thy north-to-south. January 2022).

It is also the name of the municipality's main city Aalborg and the site of its municipal council, as well as the name of a seaport.

The municipality and the town have chosen to retain the traditional spelling of the name as Aalborg, although the new spelling Ålborg is used in other contexts, such as Ålborg Bight (Ålborg Bugt), the body of water which lies to the east of the Jutland peninsula.

Municipal reform of 2007
As of 1 January 2007 Aalborg municipality joined with the municipalities of Hals, Nibe, and Sejlflod to form a new Aalborg municipality. Its last mayor was Henning G. Jensen, a member of the Social Democrats political party. The former municipality was bordered by Sejlflod and Hals to the east, Dronninglund and Brønderslev to the north, Aabybro and Nibe to the west, and Støvring and Skørping to the south. It belonged to North Jutland County.

Geography

Surroundings
The waters in the Limfjord splitting the municipality are called Langerak to the east and Gjøl Bredning to the west.  The island of Egholm is located in Gjøl Bredning, and is connected by ferry to the city of Aalborg at its southern shore.

The area is typical for the north of Jutland.  To the west, the Limfjord broadens into an irregular lake (salt water), with low, marshy shores and many islands.  Northwest is Store Vildmose ("Greater Wild bog"), a swamp where a mirage is sometimes seen in summer. Southeast lies the similar Lille Vildmose ("Lesser Wild bog").  Store Vildmose was drained and farmed in the beginning of the 20th century, and Lille Vildmose is now the largest moor in Denmark.

Urban areas in Aalborg Municipality
Aalborg City has a total population of 123,432.

Economy

Politics

Municipal council
Aalborg's municipal council consists of 31 members, elected every four years.

Below are the municipal councils elected since the Municipal Reform of 2007.

Twin towns – sister cities

Aalborg is twinned with 34 cities, more than any other city in Denmark. Every four years, Aalborg gathers young people from most of its twin towns for a week of sports, known as Ungdomslegene (Youth Games).

 , Netherlands
 Antibes, France
 Büdelsdorf, Germany
 Edinburgh, Scotland, United Kingdom
 , Norway
 Fuglafjørður, Faroe Islands
 Galway, Ireland
 Gdynia, Poland
 Haifa, Israel
 Hefei, China
 , Austria
, Greenland
 Karlskoga, Sweden
 Lancaster, England
 Lerum, Sweden
 Liperi, Finland
 , Iceland
 Orsa, Sweden
 Orust, Sweden
 Ośno Lubuskie, Poland
 , Russia
 Racine, United States
 Rapperswil-Jona, Switzerland
 Rendalen, Norway
 Rendsburg, Germany
 Riga, Latvia
 Riihimäki, Finland
 , Greenland
 Solvang, United States
 , Romania
 , Bulgaria
 Vilnius, Lithuania
 , Germany

References

 Municipal statistics: NetBorger Kommunefakta, delivered from KMD a.k.a. Kommunedata (Municipal Data)
 Municipal mergers and neighbors: Eniro map with named municipalities
 Aalborg in figures 2008, a publication from Aalborg Municipality.

External links

About Aalborg from Nordjyske Medier
Aalborg Municipality's official website
VisitAalborg (Aalborg Tourist Office)
Website for Aalborg Municipality's former Municipality Reformation Board
Public Transport in Aalborg and surroundings
Searchable map

 
Aalborg
Municipalities of the North Jutland Region
Municipalities of Denmark
Populated places established in 2007